Petromax is a brand name for a type of pressurised paraffin lamp (US: kerosene lamp) that uses a mantle. They are as synonymous with the paraffin lamp in Continental Europe as Tilley lamps are in Britain and Coleman lanterns are in the United States.

History
The Petromax lamp was created in 1910 in Germany by Max Graetz (1851–1937), who also named the brand, on the basis of a spirit lamp that was already well-known. 
    
Graetz was president of the firm Ehrich & Graetz in Berlin, which developed the lamp, and also the primary designer.

He had wanted to create a lighting system fueled by paraffin, which was then a new product.
Graetz invented a process to make a gas out of paraffin; which has a very high caloric value and could make a very hot blue flame.

Graetz then designed a pressure lamp, working with vaporized paraffin. To start this process, the lamp was preheated with methylated spirit (denatured alcohol), in later models with an integrated blow torch called "Rapidstarter" running from the paraffin tank directly. In a closed tank, paraffin was pressurised with a hand pump. The heat produced by the mantle was then used to vaporize the paraffin, which is mixed with air and blown in to mantle to burn.
Around the year 1916, the lantern and its name started to spread around the world. The name Petromax derives from "Petroleum" and "Max Graetz".

The design was such a success that it still is being used to this day. The name Petromax has become synonymous with paraffin pressure lamps in many countries.
The design of the lamps was later used to create a cooker based on the same principles.

In many countries "Petromax" is a registered Trademark, e.g. for the US by Britelyt Inc. or for Germany and some other European countries by Pelam International Ltd.

The Petromax design has been often copied, today such as by Tower in China, Lea Hin in Indonesia or Prabhat in India.

See also
Kerosene lamp
List of light sources

References

External links
Short history of Petromax and Graetz

Lighting brands
Oil lamp